Anadan is a city in Syria, 12 kilometers north of Aleppo, located on the Aleppo–Gaziantep international road. It is in the Mount Simeon District of the Aleppo Governorate. According to the Syria Central Bureau of Statistics (CBS), Anadan had a population of 11,918 in the 2004 census.

The town is known for its agriculture produce, such as grain, legumes, olives and different types of fruit. The city of Anadan is built on a hill surrounded by a plain. Anadan currently has about thirteen mosques and several elementary schools, a junior high school and a high school for boys and girls.

During the Ayyubid period, in the 1220s, Anadan was visited by Syrian geographer Yaqut al-Hamawi who noted it was "a village near Kinnasrin, in the Kurah district of Urtik, of the Awasim Province." The 13th-century Marasid listed it as a village northeast of Aleppo.

Syrian civil war
The Battle of Anadan occurred in Anadan from July 29–30, 2012, during the Syrian civil war.

It has been the site of heavy shelling by the Syrian military during the uprising against President Bashar al-Assad's government. Consequently, approximately 30,000 people—most of Anadan's population—have fled according to opposition sources. As a result, Anadan has been described as a "ghost town" by journalist Suleiman al-Khalidi of Reuters. Amnesty International released satellite images which show that Anadan has come under heavy artillery bombardment during the uprising. On 24 January 2017, Jabhat Fateh al-Sham captured the town from Ahrar al-Sham militants. On 16 February 2020, the city was recaptured by the Syrian Arab Army.

References

Populated places in Mount Simeon District